"Alibis" is a song written by Randy Boudreaux, and recorded by American country music artist Tracy Lawrence. It was released on February 11, 1993, as the lead single and title track from his album Alibis. The song became Lawrence's second number one country hit in 1993 on the US Billboard Hot Country Singles & Tracks chart and on the Canadian RPM Country Tracks chart.

Music video
The music video was directed by Marc Ball and premiered in early 1993. In the music video, Mariner High School in Cape Coral, Florida, was the school shot in the footage.

Chart performance
The song debuted at number 64 on the Hot Country Singles chart dated February 20, 1993. It charted for 20 weeks on that chart, and reached number one on the chart dated May 1, 1993, staying there for two weeks.

Weekly charts

Year-end charts

References

1993 singles
1993 songs
Tracy Lawrence songs
Songs written by Randy Boudreaux
Song recordings produced by James Stroud
Atlantic Records singles